The 1997 NASCAR Winston Cup Series was the 49th season of professional stock car racing in the United States and the 26th modern-era NASCAR Cup series. It began on February 9 and ended on November 16. Jeff Gordon of Hendrick Motorsports won his second Cup championship at the end of the season.

It was the last season until 2019 without Matt Kenseth.

Teams and drivers

Complete schedule

Limited schedule

Schedule

Races

Busch Clash 

The Busch Clash, a race for pole winners from the previous season, and drivers who have won the event before was run on February 9 in Daytona Beach, Florida. Terry Labonte drew the pole. The race was broadcast on CBS.

Top ten results

 Jeff Gordon
 Rusty Wallace
 Dale Earnhardt
 Ward Burton
 Ernie Irvan
 Mark Martin
 Dale Jarrett
 Ricky Craven
 Johnny Benson

Gatorade 125s 
The Gatorade Twin 125s were run on February 13 in Daytona Beach, Florida. Mike Skinner and Steve Grissom were the pole sitters for races one and two, respectively. The races were broadcast tape-delayed on CBS just prior to the Daytona 500.

Race one results

 88-Dale Jarrett
 31-Mike Skinner
 28-Ernie Irvan
 23-Jimmy Spencer
 4-Sterling Marlin
 6-Mark Martin
 10-Ricky Rudd
 18-Bobby Labonte
 22-Ward Burton
 29-Robert Pressley

Race two results

 3-Dale Earnhardt
 24-Jeff Gordon
 94-Bill Elliott
 33-Ken Schrader
 21-Michael Waltrip
 2-Rusty Wallace
 30-Johnny Benson
 5-Terry Labonte
 40-Robby Gordon
 17-Darrell Waltrip

39th Daytona 500 

The 1997 Daytona 500 was run on February 16 at Daytona International Speedway. The #31 of Mike Skinner won the pole. The race ended under caution after a big crash with five laps remaining involved several cars. The race was broadcast on CBS.

 24-Jeff Gordon
 5-Terry Labonte
 25-Ricky Craven
 94-Bill Elliott
 4-Sterling Marlin
 37-Jeremy Mayfield
 6-Mark Martin
 22-Ward Burton
 10-Ricky Rudd
 17-Darrell Waltrip

Failed to qualify: 91-Mike Wallace, 95-Gary Bradberry, 78-Billy Standridge, 15-Larry Pearson, 42-Joe Nemechek, 97-Chad Little, 75-Rick Mast, 96-David Green*, 0-Delma Cowart, and 84-Norm Benning.

Robert Pressley's car caught air after he spun on lap 10. The rear of the car lifted so much, the car was temporarily sliding across the track on its nose. The landing was quite hard, so after the crew repaired the car, then Busch Series competitor and future 2-time Camping World Truck Series Champion Todd Bodine hopped in to complete more laps.
Joe Nemechek's car owner Felix Sabates bought the #73 entry of Phil Barkdoll, who had qualified 38th.  Nemechek went to the #73 for the 500.
Dale Earnhardt rolled his #3 Chevrolet in a crash with the #28 Ford of Ernie Irvan while in a four-way battle for the lead with 12 laps to go.  In the crash, the hood of Irvan's car flew into the backstretch grandstand, injuring some fans.  Earnhardt famously noticed that his tires were still on the car after the roll, had his car taken off the hook, and drove it back to pit road.  The car was repaired and Earnhardt finished the race, 5 laps down in 31st. The car can be found in a diecast form in 1:64 and 1:24 scale and is known to collectors as the "crash car".
At age 25, Jeff Gordon became the youngest Daytona 500 winner ever until Trevor Bayne in 2011. Richard Petty had previously been the youngest winner in 1964 when he won the 500 at age 26.
 Hendrick Motorsports posted a 1-2-3 finish with Gordon winning the race, Terry Labonte finishing second, and Ricky Craven finishing in third.

Goodwrench Service 400 

The Goodwrench Service 400 was run on February 23 at North Carolina Speedway. The #6 of Mark Martin won the pole. The race was broadcast on TNN.

Top ten results

 24-Jeff Gordon
 88-Dale Jarrett
 99-Jeff Burton
 10-Ricky Rudd
 25-Ricky Craven
 2-Rusty Wallace
 5-Terry Labonte
 7-Geoff Bodine
 28-Ernie Irvan
 1-Morgan Shepherd

With this victory, Jeff Gordon became the fourth driver to win the Daytona 500 and the second race of the season.

Pontiac Excitement 400 

The Pontiac Excitement 400 was held March 2 at Richmond International Raceway. Terry Labonte won the pole. The race was broadcast on ESPN.

Top ten results

 2-Rusty Wallace
 7-Geoff Bodine
 88-Dale Jarrett
 24-Jeff Gordon (-1)
 43-Bobby Hamilton (-1)
 10-Ricky Rudd (-1)
 5-Terry Labonte (-1)
 18-Bobby Labonte (-1)
 30-Johnny Benson (-1)
 44-Kyle Petty (-2)

During the post-race inspection, Rusty Wallace's engine failed to meet the proper 14:1 compression ratio. Due to this, NASCAR suspended Wallace's victory and confiscated his car's motor. After conducting another test the following day, the cooler temperature engine met the required compression ratio. As a result, Wallace's victory was certified official.
Only 3 cars finished on the lead lap in this race.
This was the last Winston Cup race at Richmond International Raceway scheduled for the daytime (excluding three races that were rain-delayed from Saturday night) until 2016, and the last time that the first Richmond race of the season was held in March, due to the cold, wet weather that is often seen at Richmond in late winter.

Primestar 500 

The Primestar 500 was run on March 9 at Atlanta Motor Speedway in Hampton, Georgia. The #40 of Robby Gordon won the pole. The race was broadcast on ABC.

Top ten results

 88-Dale Jarrett
 28-Ernie Irvan
 1-Morgan Shepherd
 18-Bobby Labonte
 99-Jeff Burton
 6-Mark Martin
 21-Michael Waltrip
 3-Dale Earnhardt
 5-Terry Labonte
 43-Bobby Hamilton

Failed to qualify: 29-Robert Pressley, 36-Derrike Cope, 46-Wally Dallenbach Jr., 71-Dave Marcis, 77-Bobby Hillin Jr., 95-Ed Berrier, 08-Mike Miller

This was the final race held on the  configuration of Atlanta Motor Speedway.  Renovations had already started that would turn the racetrack into a  quad-oval.
This race was red-flagged on lap 282 due to a crash involving the #41 of Steve Grissom.  The #23 of Jimmy Spencer had spun out off Turn 2 and was hit by the #31 of Mike Skinner.  Grissom spun to avoid this wreck and hit the inside wall near where there was a gate allowing infield access for motorhomes.  Because of this, the car hit the wall tail first, breaking the wall, shearing the fuel cell out of the car, and putting Grissom on his roof.  The #91 of Mike Wallace backed off the throttle upon seeing the accident, which caused his exhaust to throw flames right over the fuel cell (which was sitting along the outside wall at the end of the backstretch).  This caused a significant fire. Grissom was not seriously injured.

TranSouth Financial 400 

The TranSouth Financial 400 was held March 23 at Darlington Raceway. Dale Jarrett won the pole. The race was broadcast on ESPN.

Until Kevin Harvick's win in this event on April 12, 2014, this would be the last Darlington race to be won by a driver who sat on the pole.

Top ten results

 88-Dale Jarrett
 16-Ted Musgrave
 24-Jeff Gordon
 99-Jeff Burton
 18-Bobby Labonte
 2-Rusty Wallace
 21-Michael Waltrip
 33-Ken Schrader
 7-Geoff Bodine
 30-Johnny Benson

Failed to qualify: 41-Steve Grissom, 78-Billy Standridge, 90-Dick Trickle

This was Phil Parsons' last Winston Cup start.
First of only 2 times that Dale Jarrett would score back-to-back victories. The second time would come in 2001.

Interstate Batteries 500 

The inaugural Interstate Batteries 500 was held April 6 at Texas Motor Speedway. Dale Jarrett won the pole.  This was the first race held at the track and the first NASCAR race in the state of Texas since 1981. The race was broadcast on CBS.

Top ten results

 99-Jeff Burton*
 88-Dale Jarrett
 18-Bobby Labonte
 5-Terry Labonte
 10-Ricky Rudd
 3-Dale Earnhardt
 22-Ward Burton
 4-Sterling Marlin
 21-Michael Waltrip
 41-Steve Grissom

Failed to qualify: 19-Gary Bradberry, 27-Rick Wilson, 29-Robert Pressley, 46-Wally Dallenbach Jr., 66-H. B. Bailey, 74-Randy LaJoie, 95-Ed Berrier, 96-David Green, 02-Mike Bliss

This was Jeff Burton's first career Winston Cup victory.
Even though this race was the inaugural event, the race date was acquired as part of the purchase of North Wilkesboro Speedway in 1996.
On the first lap of the race, 15 cars were involved in a multi-car accident in turns 1 and 2. Dale Earnhardt was involved in the incident, but was able to continue.
On lap 162, an 8-car crash on the tri-oval began when Mike Skinner, Brett Bodine and Sterling Marlin spun into the infield coming off turn 4, and Rusty Wallace struck the outside wall after getting into some oil. Later, Ernie Irvan rear-ended Greg Sacks at over 140 mph while trying to race leader Terry Labonte back to the flag to get his lap back and hit the outside wall. Jeff Gordon ran into the back of Irvan trying to avoid Sacks.
Ricky Craven suffered a concussion in a practice crash and was forced to sit out.  This was the beginning of a series of injuries that adversely affected Craven's career over the next 4 years. Todd Bodine subbed for Craven in this race and ran very well until he crashed out of the lead.

Food City 500 

The Food City 500 was held on April 13 at Bristol Motor Speedway. Rusty Wallace won the pole. The race had 20 cautions for 132 laps to set a Bristol record for the first time since 1989. The race was broadcast on ESPN.

Top ten results

 24-Jeff Gordon
 2-Rusty Wallace
 5-Terry Labonte
 88-Dale Jarrett
 6-Mark Martin
 3-Dale Earnhardt
 94-Bill Elliott
 97-Chad Little
 37-Jeremy Mayfield
 11-Brett Bodine

Failed to qualify: 20-Greg Sacks, 77-Bobby Hillin Jr., 78-Billy Standridge, 91-Mike Wallace

This race had 20 cautions for 132 laps. The 20 cautions at the time tied a record for most cautions with the 1989 spring event at Bristol. However, this race had an additional 34 laps run under caution compared to the 1989 event.
On the last lap, Jeff Gordon bumped Rusty Wallace out of the way in Turn 4 to win the race. Wallace barely was able to hold off Terry Labonte for 2nd. 
Jack Sprague subbed for Ricky Craven in this race due to Craven's injury at Texas last weekend.

Goody's Headache Powder 500 

The Goody's Headache Powder 500 was held April 20 at Martinsville Speedway. Kenny Wallace won the pole. It was FILMAR Racing's first career pole of the season. The race was broadcast on ESPN.

Top ten results

 24-Jeff Gordon
 43-Bobby Hamilton
 6-Mark Martin
 5-Terry Labonte
 2-Rusty Wallace
 81-Kenny Wallace
 37-Jeremy Mayfield
 18-Bobby Labonte
 17-Darrell Waltrip
 33-Ken Schrader

Failed to qualify: 19-Gary Bradberry, 20-Lance Hooper, 78-Billy Standridge, 79-Randy MacDonald, 96-David Green

Winner Jeff Gordon was spun out at one point of the race by Jimmy Spencer but was able to recover from the spin to win the race.
Ricky Craven returned to the #25 Chevrolet after missing 2 races due to the concussion he suffered at Texas. He finished 22nd, 2 laps down.
Jeff Gordon led 431 of the 500 laps in this race, the most laps he has led in a single race in his career.

Save Mart Supermarkets 300 
The Save Mart Supermarkets 300 was held May 4 at Sears Point Raceway. Mark Martin won the pole. The race was broadcast on ESPN.

Top ten results

 6-Mark Martin
 24-Jeff Gordon
 5-Terry Labonte
 88-Dale Jarrett
 17-Darrell Waltrip
 11-Brett Bodine
 21-Michael Waltrip
 28-Ernie Irvan
 99-Jeff Burton
 22-Ward Burton

Failed to qualify: 29-Robert Pressley, 42-Joe Nemechek, 45-Gary Smith, 75-Rick Mast, 78w-Chuck Pruitt, 90-Dick Trickle, 96-David Green, 97-Chad Little, 09-R. K. Smith

The Melling Racing #9 team technically did not make the trip to Sears Point due to a lack of funding.  However, they allowed Jeff Davis' Winston West Series team to use their number on their Ford so that the Melling team could get the owners' points.  Davis ended up crashing out of the race, finishing 37th.
This was the last race for the Winston Cup Series on the  configuration at Sears Point Raceway until 2019. After this event, a purpose-built section was added for the NASCAR weekend.
After David Green failed to qualify, Caterpillar put their logos on the #35 Ford was driven by Larry Gunselman, one of the Winston West teams.  Gunselman started the race, but Green did get in the car and drive at one point.
The #19 Child Support Recovery Ford for Tri-Star Motorsports that was driven by Gary Bradberry in the race was actually qualified by Ken Pedersen, a driver in Winston West at the time.
The #78 Ford for Triad Motorsports tapped Tom Hubert, a crew member for Bahari Racing, to qualify the #78 in 2nd round qualifying.  When Hubert (who had some road racing experience in other classes) qualified fast enough to earn the 27th starting spot in the race, Hubert was put in the car for the race to temporarily replace the team's regular driver, Billy Standridge.
This was the final race at Sears Point held in May, as it had been for the previous 5 years. In 1998, the race moved to the last Sunday in June, where it would remain through 2017.
Geoff Bodine Racing's sponsor; QVC, ran an unusual promotion in which a lucky fan would get their name and face on Geoff Bodine's #7 QVC Ford, with the winner being Mississippi native Dawn Gillis. Ultimately, however, Bodine would finish in last place.

Winston 500 

The Winston 500 at Talladega Superspeedway was originally scheduled for Sunday, April 27, but rain forced the race to be postponed. Teams returned on Saturday, May 10 (Mother's Day weekend), and the race was held under sunny skies.

John Andretti started from the pole position. The race was run caution-free, the first time in Talladega history. The race was broadcast on ESPN.

Top ten results

 6-Mark Martin
 3-Dale Earnhardt
 18-Bobby Labonte
 98-John Andretti
 24-Jeff Gordon
 5-Terry Labonte
 23-Jimmy Spencer
 99-Jeff Burton
 30-Johnny Benson
 28-Ernie Irvan

Failed to qualify: 19-Gary Bradberry, 42-Joe Nemechek*, 73-Phil Barkdoll, 78-Billy Standridge, 91-Mike Wallace, 95-Ed Berrier

Joe Nemechek drove the #40 Chevrolet in place of Robby Gordon during this race since Gordon was attempting to do the Indy-Charlotte double in 1997.  As a result of the rescheduled race, it conflicted with Pole Day at Indianapolis.  As part of the contract that Gordon signed with SABCO Racing, the owner Felix Sabates provided a team for Gordon to attempt Indianapolis with.  As for Nemechek, he finished 19th, 1 lap down in Gordon's car.
This was the last race for the #20 Ford for Ranier-Walsh Racing.  The acquisition of their sponsor Hardee's by CKE Restaurants resulted in the company pulling sponsorship of the team. Without sponsorship, the team shut its doors. The #20 car would remain inactive until 1999 when Tony Stewart drove it for Joe Gibbs Racing.
Final time in his career that Mark Martin would win back-to-back races.

Winston Open 

The Winston Open was held before The Winston All-Star Race on May 17 at Charlotte Motor Speedway as a last chance qualifier race for the cars that had not won a race yet in 1997 or late 1996 and was not a past champion. Chad Little won the pole. The winner of this race would qualify to be in The Winston All-Star Race.

Top ten results

 25-Ricky Craven
 41-Steve Grissom
 9-Lake Speed
 97-Chad Little
 8-Hut Stricklin
 46-Wally Dallenbach Jr.
 30-Johnny Benson
 33-Ken Schrader
 98-John Andretti
 31-Mike Skinner

The Winston 

The Winston is the All-Star Race for the NASCAR Winston Cup Series held at the Charlotte Motor Speedway on May 17 after the Winston Open Race. Drivers have to qualify; Win a race since last year The Winston race, Win the Winston Open qualifier race, or Win one of The Winston All-Star Races from the past 5 years. This race was run in 3 segments with 2 30 lap segments and a 10 lap shootout segment for a total of 70 laps. Bill Elliott won the pole. Dale Jarrett won the first segment and Bobby Labonte won the second segment. The final segment results are posted in the top ten below. The race was broadcast on TNN.

Top ten final segment results

 24-Jeff Gordon
 18-Bobby Labonte
 5-Terry Labonte
 3-Dale Earnhardt
 23-Jimmy Spencer
 6-Mark Martin
 88-Dale Jarrett
 25-Ricky Craven
 10-Ricky Rudd
 94-Bill Elliott

 The only caution came on the 3rd lap of the first segment when Bobby Labonte spun coming off turn 4.
 Gordon started 19th because of a problem during his qualifying run.
 After the first segment was completed, the finishing order would be inverted for the start of the 2nd segment. The finishing order of the 2nd segment determined how the field would line up for the final segment. Caution laps counted in the first two 30-lap stages; however, only green flag laps were recorded in the final 10-lap stage.
 Speedvision carried a special live in-car simulcast of this race.

Coca-Cola 600 

The Coca-Cola 600 was held May 25 at Charlotte Motor Speedway. Jeff Gordon won the pole. The race was shortened to 333 laps due to time issues after a long rain delay; it was after 1:00 am EDT when the race was completed. The race was broadcast on TBS.

Top ten results

 24-Jeff Gordon
 2-Rusty Wallace
 6-Mark Martin
 94-Bill Elliott
 99-Jeff Burton
 18-Bobby Labonte
 3-Dale Earnhardt
 5-Terry Labonte
 1-Morgan Shepherd
 10-Ricky Rudd

Failed to qualify: 71-Dave Marcis, 77-Bobby Hillin Jr., 91-Mike Wallace, 95-Ed Berrier, 97-Chad Little

Race shortened to 333 laps (499.5 Miles) due to rain.
Geoff Bodine suffered a concussion in a practice crash on the Wednesday before the race in Turn 1. As a result, Geoff tapped his younger brother Todd to drive his #7 Ford in the race. However, the engine blew after Todd had made a run up through the field, leaving him with a 42nd-place finish.
 This was the final race for flagman Doyle Ford, who had spent 38 years as a NASCAR official.

Miller 500 

The Miller 500 was held June 1 at Dover Downs International Speedway. The #18 of Bobby Labonte won the pole. The race was broadcast on TNN.

Top ten results

 10-Ricky Rudd
 6-Mark Martin
 99-Jeff Burton
 37-Jeremy Mayfield
 44-Kyle Petty
 33-Ken Schrader
 21-Michael Waltrip
 94-Bill Elliott
 31-Mike Skinner
 4-Sterling Marlin

Failed to qualify: 78-Billy Standridge, 95-Ed Berrier

This was the last  race held at Dover.
Robby Gordon, in a rather freak incident during the Indianapolis 500, suffered significant burns to his legs early on when an invisible fire started in the cockpit of his #42 Chevy-powered G-Force. This forced him to sit out for a couple of weeks. Wally Dallenbach Jr. subbed for Gordon at Dover, finishing 36th after suffering electrical problems. He was credited with completing 364 laps of the 500 lap distance.
Three different leaders had problems in the last 50 miles of the race.  Second-place Jeff Gordon hit the back of leader Dale Jarrett while trying to avoid a spinning Kenny Wallace on lap 452.  The contact broke Gordon's radiator and forced him behind the wall for repairs, eventually finishing 26th.  Jarrett retook the lead after the caution, but blew an engine 5 laps after the restart; he finished 32nd.  Jarrett's teammate Ernie Irvan inherited the lead and led the following 9 laps, but on lap 472, Chad Little broke a rear end in Turn 1 and dropped grease on the track.  Irvan hit it, spun, and crashed out, finishing 30th.  That gave the lead to Rudd, who held it the final 27 laps to win.

Pocono 500 

The Pocono 500 was held June 8 at Pocono Raceway. The #43 of Bobby Hamilton won the pole. The race was broadcast on TNN.

Top ten results

 24-Jeff Gordon
 99-Jeff Burton
 88-Dale Jarrett
 6-Mark Martin
 37-Jeremy Mayfield
 16-Ted Musgrave
 17-Darrell Waltrip
 7-Geoff Bodine
 5-Terry Labonte
 3-Dale Earnhardt

Greg Sacks was tapped to sub for Robby Gordon in the #40 starting here at Pocono.  He qualified 4th but spun into the wall coming out of Turn 1 on Lap 9 immediately in front of Jeff Gordon.

Miller 400 

The Miller 400 was held June 15 at Michigan Speedway. Dale Jarrett won the pole. The race was broadcast on CBS.

Top ten results

 28-Ernie Irvan*
 94-Bill Elliott
 6-Mark Martin
 16-Ted Musgrave
 24-Jeff Gordon
 88-Dale Jarrett
 3-Dale Earnhardt
 36-Derrike Cope
 18-Bobby Labonte
 30-Johnny Benson

This was Ernie Irvan's 15th and final Winston Cup victory, and it came at the very same track where he had almost lost his life three years earlier. He had tears in his eyes as he brought the 28 car into Victory Lane. The win also came in his last year with Robert Yates Racing.
This was the 1st career Winston Cup start for Jerry Nadeau in the #1 Pontiac for Precision Products Racing.  He replaced Morgan Shepherd in the car.
This race would be the final CBS race that Ken Squier was the lap-by-lap announcer for. Starting with the DieHard 500 in October, all future races aired on CBS would have Mike Joy as the lap-by-lap announcer while Squier was transferred to serving as the studio host.

California 500 presented by NAPA 

The inaugural California 500 presented by NAPA was held on June 22 at California Speedway. The #42 of Joe Nemechek won the pole. The race was broadcast on ABC.

Top ten results

 24-Jeff Gordon
 5-Terry Labonte
 10-Ricky Rudd
 16-Ted Musgrave
 23-Jimmy Spencer
 18-Bobby Labonte
 29-Jeff Green
 88-Dale Jarrett
 25-Ricky Craven
 6-Mark Martin

Failed to qualify: 78-Billy Standridge, 81-Kenny Wallace, 91-Mike Wallace*

After Mike Wallace failed to qualify for the race, his team hastily entered the  Winston West race which was run the day before the Winston Cup race. He finished 3rd to Ken Schrader in that race.
Mark Martin ran out of gas with 10 laps to go and was forced to the pits for additional fuel. However, they did not get enough fuel in the car. This resulted in Martin running out of gas again on the last lap and having to coast to the line.
This was the only Cup race at California Speedway run in June. The following year, the California 500 moved to the first week of May, swapping dates with Sears Point Raceway.

Pepsi 400 

The Pepsi 400 was held on July 5 at Daytona International Speedway. The #31 of Mike Skinner won the pole. The race was broadcast on ESPN for the last time.

Top ten results

 98-John Andretti
 5-Terry Labonte
 4-Sterling Marlin
 3-Dale Earnhardt
 88-Dale Jarrett
 2-Rusty Wallace
 44-Kyle Petty
 99-Jeff Burton
 28-Ernie Irvan
 18-Bobby Labonte

Failed to qualify: 7-Geoff Bodine, 29-Jeff Green, 91-Loy Allen Jr.

This was John Andretti's first Winston Cup career win.
This was the last July race at Daytona scheduled to run during the day. The 2014 Coke Zero 400 was run during the day, but only after being postponed due to rain the previous night.
The race ended with a 1 lap shootout, likely the last such shootout in the Winston Cup Series. John Andretti's crew chief Tony Furr employed a rather cynical strategy of brake-checking the field on the final restart, resulting in a stack-up of cars on the backstretch. As the field entered the final turns, cars spread out 3 and 4 wide, resulting in a multi-car wreck developed in turn 4. On ESPN's telecast of the race, the spotter for one of the drivers involved could be heard yelling "Goddammit."
It was also Cale Yarborough's first and only victory as a car owner.

Jiffy Lube 300 

The Jiffy Lube 300 was held July 13 at New Hampshire International Speedway. #33 of Ken Schrader won the pole. The race was broadcast on TNN.

Top ten results

 99-Jeff Burton
 3-Dale Earnhardt
 2-Rusty Wallace
 41-Steve Grissom
 6-Mark Martin
 94-Bill Elliott
 5-Terry Labonte
 28-Ernie Irvan
 10-Ricky Rudd
 7-Geoff Bodine

Pennsylvania 500 

The Pennsylvania 500 was held July 20 at Pocono Raceway. The #42 of Joe Nemechek won the pole. The race was broadcast on TBS.

Top ten results

 88-Dale Jarrett
 24-Jeff Gordon
 99-Jeff Burton
 16-Ted Musgrave
 6-Mark Martin
 31-Mike Skinner
 23-Jimmy Spencer
 44-Kyle Petty
 37-Jeremy Mayfield
 94-Bill Elliott

Brickyard 400 

The Brickyard 400 was held August 3 at Indianapolis Motor Speedway. Ernie Irvan won the pole. The race was broadcast on ABC.

Top ten results

 10-Ricky Rudd
 18-Bobby Labonte
 88-Dale Jarrett
 24-Jeff Gordon
 37-Jeremy Mayfield
 6-Mark Martin
 30-Johnny Benson
 94-Bill Elliott
 31-Mike Skinner
 28-Ernie Irvan

Failed to qualify: 1-Mike Wallace,  7-Geoff Bodine, 8-Hut Stricklin, 61-Tim Steele, 71-Dave Marcis, 77-Morgan Shepherd, 78-Bobby Hillin Jr., 90-Dick Trickle

First time since 1987 that Ricky Rudd win multiple races in a season.

The Bud at The Glen 

The Bud at The Glen was held August 10 at Watkins Glen International.  The #34 of Todd Bodine (in a one-off Winston Cup race for Team 34 Racing, his Busch Series team at the time) won the pole. The race was broadcast on ESPN.

Top ten results

 24-Jeff Gordon
 7-Geoff Bodine
 2-Rusty Wallace
 40-Robby Gordon
 6-Mark Martin
 16-Ted Musgrave
 94-Bill Elliott
 5-Terry Labonte
 41-Steve Grissom
 46-Wally Dallenbach Jr.

This was Jeff Gordon's 1st career victory on a road course, beginning a streak of 6 consecutive road course wins that lasted until 2000.
This race was the 1st career Winston Cup start for Steve Park, driving the #14 Chevrolet for Dale Earnhardt Inc.  He qualified well but ended up finishing 33rd, 2 laps down.

DeVilbiss 400 

The DeVilbiss 400 was held August 17 at Michigan Speedway. The #30 of Johnny Benson won the pole. The race was broadcast on ESPN.

Top ten results

 6-Mark Martin
 24-Jeff Gordon
 16-Ted Musgrave
 28-Ernie Irvan
 88-Dale Jarrett
 18-Bobby Labonte
 94-Bill Elliott
 99-Jeff Burton
 3-Dale Earnhardt
 5-Terry Labonte

Mark Martin won after coming from 2 laps down after suffering a blown left rear tire.
Roush Racing drivers dominated the day leading 177 of 200 laps.

Goody's Headache Powder 500 

The Goody's Headache Powder 500 was held August 23 at Bristol Motor Speedway. The #81 of Kenny Wallace won the pole. The race was broadcast on ESPN.

Top ten results

 88-Dale Jarrett
 6-Mark Martin
 90-Dick Trickle
 99-Jeff Burton
 41-Steve Grissom
 33-Ken Schrader
 5-Terry Labonte
 18-Bobby Labonte
 7-Geoff Bodine*
 4-Sterling Marlin

Failed to qualify: 40-Robby Gordon, 71-Dave Marcis, 77-Morgan Shepherd

Jeff Gordon was spun out of the lead by Jeremy Mayfield around the halfway point of the race.
David Green got on his side during a crash around lap 260. The ground along on his driver's side after getting bounced off the #36 of Derrike Cope into the wall coming off Turn 4. Green was ok.
Shortly after the halfway point, Geoff Bodine's crew chief Pat Tryson quit the team, apparently unhappy with the way the team was (or wasn't) being managed.

Mountain Dew Southern 500 

The Mountain Dew Southern 500 was held August 31 at Darlington Raceway. Bobby Labonte won the pole. The race was broadcast on ESPN.

Top ten results

 24-Jeff Gordon*
 99-Jeff Burton
 88-Dale Jarrett
 94-Bill Elliott
 10-Ricky Rudd
 5-Terry Labonte
 18-Bobby Labonte
 6-Mark Martin
 21-Michael Waltrip
 33-Ken Schrader

Failed to qualify: 71-Dave Marcis, 77-Morgan Shepherd, 91-Greg Sacks

Jeff Gordon's victory made him the 2nd and final driver, joining Bill Elliott, to win the Winston Million. Ironically, the 2 drivers that won the Winston Million won it in the very first running in 1985, and in the very last running in 1997. The program was replaced the following season in 1998 with the No Bull 5 program, which offered five drivers (that finished in the Top 5 of the last No Bull 5 race) the chance to win 1 million dollars.
Dale Earnhardt mysteriously passed out during the pace laps for the race and hit the wall.  Nobody is really sure what caused this, but Earnhardt had to step out of the car for the day. Once the car was repaired, Busch Series driver Mike Dillon (the son-in-law of car owner Richard Childress) was tapped to sub in the #3. Dillon drove the car to a 30th-place finish, 85 laps down.
"Jeff Burton will make a challenge off the corner onto the straightaway, but Jeff Gordon wins it!" - Bob Jenkins as Jeff Burton tried to challenge Gordon for the victory in the last corners

Exide NASCAR Select Batteries 400 

The Exide NASCAR Select Batteries 400 was held September 6 at Richmond International Raceway. The #94 of Bill Elliott won the pole. The race was broadcast on ESPN.

Top ten results

 88-Dale Jarrett
 99-Jeff Burton
 24-Jeff Gordon
 7-Geoff Bodine
 2-Rusty Wallace
 42-Joe Nemechek
 22-Ward Burton
 27-Kenny Irwin Jr.*
 16-Ted Musgrave
 37-Jeremy Mayfield

This was Kenny Irwin Jr.'s 1st career Winston Cup start.

CMT 300 

The CMT 300 was held September 14 at New Hampshire International Speedway. The #33 of Ken Schrader won the pole. The race was broadcast on TNN.

Top ten results

 24-Jeff Gordon
 28-Ernie Irvan
 43-Bobby Hamilton
 41-Steve Grissom
 25-Ricky Craven
 88-Dale Jarrett
 23-Jimmy Spencer
 3-Dale Earnhardt
 6-Mark Martin
 8-Hut Stricklin

This was the 1st September race held at New Hampshire International Speedway.  The race date was acquired as part of the purchase of North Wilkesboro Speedway in 1996 that resulted in its dates being split.
Jeff Burton had an inner ear problem and required relief from Todd Bodine.
10th and final win of 1997 for Jeff Gordon.
Jeff Gordon became the 1st driver since Darrell Waltrip in 1981 & 1982 to score 10 victories in back-to-back seasons. However, Darrell Waltrip scored 12 victories in each season.

MBNA 400 

The MBNA 400 was held September 21 at Dover Downs International Speedway. Mark Martin won the pole. The race was broadcast on TNN.

Top ten results

 6-Mark Martin
 3-Dale Earnhardt
 44-Kyle Petty
 18-Bobby Labonte
 88-Dale Jarrett
 10-Ricky Rudd
 24-Jeff Gordon
 94-Bill Elliott
 28-Ernie Irvan
 75-Rick Mast

Failed to qualify: 14-Steve Park

This was the first  race at Dover.
Mark Martin and Kyle Petty dominated this race, with Martin leading 194 laps and Petty leading 191. This would also be Kyle Petty's last top 5 finish until the 2007 Coca-Cola 600.

Hanes 500 

The Hanes 500 was held September 29 at Martinsville Speedway. Ward Burton won the pole. The race was broadcast on ESPN.

Top ten results

 99-Jeff Burton
 3-Dale Earnhardt
 43-Bobby Hamilton
 24-Jeff Gordon
 94-Bill Elliott
 81-Kenny Wallace
 22-Ward Burton
 25-Ricky Craven
 33-Ken Schrader
 28-Ernie Irvan

Jeff Burton inherited the lead after leader Rusty Wallace jumped a restart and was black-flagged as a result.
Steve Park drove the #40 Chevrolet in place of Robby Gordon, who was subbing for Dario Franchitti at the inaugural Marlboro 500 CART race at California Speedway. Park blew an engine early and finished 41st. Ironically, Franchitti would drive the 40 car in 2008, 11 years later.

UAW-GM Quality 500 

The UAW-GM Quality 500 was held October 5 at Charlotte Motor Speedway.  The #7 of Geoff Bodine won the pole. The race was broadcast on TBS.

Top ten results

 88-Dale Jarrett
 18-Bobby Labonte
 3-Dale Earnhardt
 6-Mark Martin
 24-Jeff Gordon
 99-Jeff Burton
 94-Bill Elliott
 22-Ward Burton
 44-Kyle Petty
 30-Johnny Benson

Failed to qualify: 14-Steve Park, 15-Greg Sacks, 17-Darrell Waltrip, 31-Mike Skinner, 40-Elliott Sadler*, 71-Dave Marcis, 75-Rick Mast

Waltrip failed to qualify because Terry Labonte, who was higher in points, used the past champion's provisional. This was Waltrip's first DNQ in 23 years; last time was the 1974 Winston 500.
This was Rick Wilson's final Cup start.
This was the first career start for Kevin Lepage in the #91 Chevrolet. He finished 40th after wrecking.
Early in the race, there was an unusual water seepage problem on the backstretch.  This resulted in the track near the outside wall in the middle of the backstretch being wet to the point where cars were kicking up spray. This did not cause any problems, however.
This was the first race for ISM Racing's #35 Pontiac with Todd Bodine as the driver. The car qualified well, then sank to the rear of the field and eventually finished 26th, 4 laps down.

DieHard 500 

The DieHard 500 was held October 12 at Talladega Superspeedway. Ernie Irvan won the pole. Like many Talladega races, the story was "the Big One", collecting 23 cars on lap 140 after Jeff Gordon cut a tire and turned into traffic. Mark Martin was furious after the wreck, and made an infamous quote. "I hate restrictor plate racing," he said while being interviewed by a pit reporter. The race was broadcast on CBS.

Top ten results

 5–Terry Labonte
 18–Bobby Labonte
 98–John Andretti
 33–Ken Schrader
 28–Ernie Irvan
 25–Ricky Craven
 44–Kyle Petty
 7–Geoff Bodine
 75–Rick Mast
 2–Rusty Wallace

Failed to qualify: 8–Hut Stricklin, 22–Ward Burton, 29–Jeff Green, 78–Gary Bradberry, 95–Ed Berrier

The top 5 (T. Labonte, B. Labonte, Andretti, Schrader, Irvan) became the first drivers eligible for the Winston No Bull 5 million dollar bonus for next season, meaning that if any of them were to win the 1998 Daytona 500, they would receive an extra $1 million.
With this win Terry Labonte became only the second Chevrolet driver to win a race in 1997. Jeff Gordon had all of the other wins for Chevrolet in 1997.
Last top 5 finish for Ernie Irvan.
Last Talladega race to be broadcast by CBS.  The network's acquisition of the AFC broadcasting rights for 1998, coupled with NASCAR's shifting the second Talladega race from July to October, meant that CBS's 22-year relationship with Talladega came to an end after the 1997 running.
This was the last time the DieHard brand sponsored the second Talladega race. Starting in 1998, DieHard and Winston, sponsor of the spring Winston 500 race, swapped race sponsorships.
This would be the first CBS race for Mike Joy as the lap-by-lap broadcaster.

AC Delco 400 

The AC Delco 400 was held on Monday, October 27 at North Carolina Speedway. Bobby Labonte won the pole. It was originally scheduled to be run on Sunday, October 26 but heavy rain pushed the start to Monday morning. The race was broadcast on TNN.

Top ten results

 43–Bobby Hamilton
 88–Dale Jarrett
 25–Ricky Craven
 24–Jeff Gordon
 90–Dick Trickle
 6–Mark Martin
 5–Terry Labonte
 3–Dale Earnhardt
 4–Sterling Marlin
 42–Joe Nemechek

Failed to qualify: 11–Brett Bodine, 71–Dave Marcis

Dura Lube 500 presented by Kmart 

The Dura Lube 500 presented by Kmart was held November 2 at Phoenix International Raceway. Bobby Hamilton won the pole. Dale Jarrett's victory in this race marked the final victory for the Ford Thunderbird. The race was broadcast on TNN.

Top ten results

 88-Dale Jarrett
 2-Rusty Wallace
 43-Bobby Hamilton
 33-Ken Schrader
 3-Dale Earnhardt
 6-Mark Martin
 30-Johnny Benson
 41-Steve Grissom
 44-Kyle Petty
 7-Geoff Bodine

Failed to qualify: 1-Morgan Shepherd

NAPA 500 

The 1997 championship season finale was the NAPA 500 held November 16 at Atlanta Motor Speedway. During the summer, the track had been reconfigured from a traditional oval to a quad-shaped oval. The race was broadcast on ESPN.

Jeff Gordon entered the race with a 77-point advantage over Dale Jarrett and an 88-point advantage over Mark Martin. During a practice session on Saturday, Gordon was driving down the pit lane, scrubbing his tires to heat them up on what was a cold morning. Gordon lost control and crashed into the parked car of Bobby Hamilton. Gordon had to go to a backup car, and qualified a lowly 37th. Gordon had to finish 18th or better to clinch the championship, but starting deep in the field, he had charge his way up through the pack. Jarrett finished 2nd, Martin 3rd, and Gordon 17th, while Bobby Labonte took the victory, the first win for Joe Gibbs Racing since the team switched from Chevrolet to Pontiac. Gordon ultimately hung on and won the title by only 14 points over Jarrett and 29 points over Martin, the closest three-way points finish under the Bob Latford 1975 points system.

Top ten results

 18-Bobby Labonte
 88-Dale Jarrett
 6-Mark Martin
 29-Jeff Green
 36-Derrike Cope
 44-Kyle Petty
 43-Bobby Hamilton
 42-Joe Nemechek
 22-Ward Burton
 30-Johnny Benson

Failed to qualify: 8-Hut Stricklin, 35-Todd Bodine, 40-Greg Sacks, 71-Dave Marcis, 77-Robert Pressley, 95-Ed Berrier, 96-David Green
Bobby Labonte won the first race on the new 1.54 mile configuration on Atlanta and became the first driver to win on both configurations of the track.

NASCAR Thunder Special Suzuka 

The NASCAR Thunder Special Suzuka was a non points exhibition race held November 23 on the Suzuka Circuit - East Circuit in Japan. Mark Martin won the pole. The race was broadcast on TBS.

Top ten results

 31-Mike Skinner
  6-Mark Martin
 74-Randy LaJoie
 96-David Green
 21-Michael Waltrip
 09-Jim Richards
 72-Kenny Wallace
 38-Butch Gilliland
  5-Jack Sprague
  7-Geoff Bodine

This was the final race for Ford Thunderbirds. Mark Martin ran a Thunderbird and finished 2nd.
Bill France Jr. suffered a mild heart attack during the trip to Japan. He recovered to live nearly another 10 years.
Rain tires were used on Winston Cup cars for the first time ever during Qualifying and Practice sessions.

Results and standings

Drivers' championship 
(key) Bold - Pole position awarded by time. Italics - Pole position set by owner's points standings. * – Most laps led.

NASCAR Rookie of the Year 

After running the Cup series part-time for a decade, Mike Skinner finally ran a full-time schedule, and walked away with three top-tens and the Rookie of the Year title. His closest runner-up was David Green, despite the fact Green did not finish any higher than sixteenth. Third place was Green's brother Jeff, who came into the season midway with Diamond Ridge Motorsports. The last place finisher was Robby Gordon, who suffered through a tumultuous season with Team SABCO, dealing with injuries and personal disputes.

See also
1997 NASCAR Busch Series
1997 NASCAR Craftsman Truck Series

References

External links 
 Winston Cup Standings and Statistics for 1997

 
NASCAR Cup Series seasons